Marko Jakolić (born 16 April 1991) is a Slovenian football defender who plays for Krka.

Career
On 23 December 2016, Jakolić signed a one-year contract with Bulgarian First League club Montana. He left in June 2017 due to a relegation clause in his contract.

References

External links
NZS profile 

1991 births
Living people
People from Brežice
Slovenian footballers
Association football fullbacks
Slovenian expatriate footballers
Expatriate footballers in Switzerland
Expatriate footballers in Bulgaria
Slovenian expatriate sportspeople in Switzerland
Slovenian expatriate sportspeople in Bulgaria
NK Krka players
NK Krško players
NK Ivančna Gorica players
NK Celje players
FC Montana players
Slovenian Second League players
Slovenian PrvaLiga players
First Professional Football League (Bulgaria) players